NCAA Season 83 is the 2007–08 Season of the National Collegiate Athletic Association (Philippines).

José Rizal University is the host of the 2007–2008 season, with this year's theme " Soaring High and Free at 83". NCAA Season 82's commissioner Jun Bernardino was supposed to be the commissioner, if not for his death.

Former Shell Turbo Chargers head coach and Basketball Coaches Association of the Philippines president Chito Narvasa will be this season's commissioner, succeeding Bernardino.

PCU eligibity scandal
After allegations of identity switching circulated via text messaging, Philippine Christian University (PCU) was investigated by the Management Committee (MANCOM) for alleged eligibility infractions on several of its varsity teams. The MANCOM has completed its own investigation and are waiting for PCU's internal investigation and has hinted of suspending the Dolphins for Season 83 after PCU's representatives did not show up in the MANCOM meeting.

After the deliberation by the MANCOM, the NCAA, via a statement issued by NCAA and José Rizal University (JRU) President Vicente Fabella, suspended the Dolphins from all events after four players of the Baby Dolphins basketball team were found to have used falsified documents. The Baby Dolphins were ordered to return their second-place trophy from last season's tournament and all individual awards. The senior Dolphins' 2005-06 general championship trophy was retained, however.

Basketball

Seniors' tournament

Elimination round

Bracket

Juniors' tournament

Elimination round

Bracket

Volleyball

Men's tournament
The men's volleyball tournament began last July 8 at Saint Placid's Gym, San Beda College in Manila with six schools participating.

Team standings
Host team in boldface.

Finals
 Letran Knights def.  St. Benilde Blazers

Women's tournament
The women's volleyball tournament began last July 8 at Saint Placid's Gym, San Beda College in Manila with five schools participating.

Team standings
Since San Sebastian swept the eliminations, the next two best teams in the cumulative standings advances to the Finals, with San Sebastian having the twice-to-beat advantage, instead of the usual best-of-3 series.
Host team in boldface.* San Sebastian by virtue of their sweep clinches a Finals bye.

Semifinal
 St. Benilde Lady Blazers def.  Letran Lady Knights, 19-25, 18-25, 25-20, 26-24, 15-8.

Finals
 San Sebastian Lady Stags vs.  St. Benilde Lady Blazers, the San Sebastian Lady Stags enjoys a twice-to-beat advantage after sweeping the eliminations
Game 1:  St. Benilde Lady Blazers defeated  San Sebastian Lady Stags- 25-21, 25-17, 18-25, 22-25, 15-13
Game 2:  San Sebastian Lady Stags defeated  St. Benilde Lady Blazers - 25-19, 25-16, 25-13
San Sebastian wins the title for the third consecutive year

Juniors' tournament
The juniors' volleyball tournament began last July 8 at Saint Placid's Gym, San Beda College in Manila with five schools participating.

Team standings
Host team in boldface.

Finals
 San Sebastian Staglets def.  UPHD Altalettes

Chess

Seniors' tournament

Elimination round

Juniors' tournament

Elimination round

Cheerdance competition
The NCAA Cheerdance Competition was held on September 5, 2007 at the Araneta Coliseum. The UPHSD PerpSquad successfully defended their championship, the Mapúa Cheerping Cardinals very much improved to second place as compared to their 2nd runner-up finish from last year, while the Letran Cheering Squad held a notch lower and settled at third place.

The Cheerdance Competition is not counted in the tabulation of the General Championship.

See also
UAAP Season 70

References

External links
NCAA official website

2007 in Philippine sport
2007 in multi-sport events
2008 in Philippine sport
2008 in multi-sport events
83